Le Mont High School, Lavasa was an international school based in the city of Lavasa, India. It was a co-educational residential school. The school has shut down operations after one year of opening due to insufficient number of students. The infrastructure built for this international school project is however intact and the future is unknown.

References

International schools in India
Cambridge schools in India
High schools and secondary schools in Maharashtra
Schools in Pune district
Defunct schools in India